The pschent (Greek ψχέντ) was the double crown worn by rulers in ancient Egypt. The ancient Egyptians generally referred to it as sekhemty (sḫm.ty), the Two Powerful Ones. It combined the White Hedjet Crown of Upper Egypt and the Red Deshret Crown of Lower Egypt.

The Pschent represented the pharaoh's power over all of unified Egypt. It bore two animal emblems:  an Egyptian cobra, known as the uraeus, ready to strike, which symbolized the Lower Egyptian goddess Wadjet; and an Egyptian vulture representing the Upper Egyptian tutelary goddess Nekhbet. These were fastened to the front of the Pschent and referred to as the Two Ladies.

History

The invention of the Pschent is generally attributed to the First Dynasty pharaoh Menes, but the first one known to wear a Double Crown was the First Dynasty pharaoh Djet: a rock inscription shows his Horus wearing it.

The king list on the Palermo Stone, which begins with the names of Lower Egyptian pharaohs (nowadays thought to have been mythological demigods), shown wearing the Red Crown, marks the unification of the country by giving the Pschent to all First Dynasty and later pharaohs. The Cairo fragment, on the other hand, shows these prehistoric rulers wearing the Pschent.

Archaeology
As is the case with the Deshret and the Hedjet Crowns, no Pschent has survived. It is known only from statuary, depictions, inscriptions, and ancient tales.

Mythology
Among the deities sometimes depicted wearing the Double Crown are Horus and Atum or Ra both representing the pharaoh or having a special relationship to the pharaoh.

Gallery

See also
 Atef – Hedjet Crown with feathers identified with Osiris
 Khepresh – Blue or War Crown also called Royal Crown
 N-red crown (n hieroglyph)
 N-water ripple (n hieroglyph)
 Uraeus – Rearing Cobra

References

External links
 
 

Crowns (headgear)
Egyptian artefact types
Wadjet